Christopher Kochanek is an American astronomer. He works in the fields of cosmology, gravitational lensing, and supernovae. Kochanek currently is an Ohio Eminent Scholar at Ohio State University as well as an Elected Fellow of the American Association for the Advancement of Science.

In 2020, he was the recipient of the Beatrice M. Tinsley Prize with Krzysztof Stanek for their leadership of the All-Sky Automated Survey for Supernovae ASAS-SN), in addition to the Dannie Heineman Prize for Astrophysics.

References

Year of birth missing (living people)
Living people
Fellows of the American Association for the Advancement of Science
Ohio State University faculty
American astronomers
California Institute of Technology alumni